Winky Wiryawan who has full name Nurayendra Irwindo (Hangul: 윈키 위르자완) (born 9 December 1978) is an actor from Indonesia. In addition, he is also known as one of the DJ (disc jockey) from Jakarta thus the nickname DJ Winky is also attached to it.

Career 
He was offered a role as Ferdy in the film Jelangkung (2001), which directed by Rizal Mantovani and Jose Purnomo.

Winky then played in a similar themed film, Titik Hitam (2002) directed by Sentot Sahid, who later introduced himself as the director Rudy Soedjarwo and producer Leo Sutanto. Introduction was then opened up opportunities for Winky to star in Singa Karawang-Bekasi (2003), and Chasing the Sun (2004), With the Chasing the Sun, Winky won the category of Best Crying Scene MTV Indonesia Movie Awards (MIMA) 2004.

In 2006, Winky starred in 3 movies at once, Ruang, Berbagi Suami, and 6:30. In the same year, Winky also won the Most Favorite Supporting Actor nomination in the MTV Indonesian Movie Award 2006 through the film Berbagi Suami.

Personal life 
Winky is married to Asmara Siswandari aka Kenes, after 3.5 years together on 1 October 2004, at Masjid At-Taqwa, South Jakarta. 
Before, they performed traditional proposal ceremony on 17 July 2004.

Discography

Album
 TOKYO (2005)
 Flower Transformer (2007)

Filmography

Film

Television series

Awards and nominations

External links 
 Profile on Cineplex
  Winky Wiryawan on IMDb
  Winky Wiryawan Official Twitter
  Winky Wiryawan Fanbase Official Twitter

References 

1978 births
Indonesian actors
Indonesian DJs
People from Bandung
People from Java
Living people
Electronic dance music DJs